Yegor Alekseyevich Chernyshov (born 10 July 1998) is a Russian football player who plays for Ocean Kerch.

Club career
He made his debut in the Russian Professional Football League for FC Sibir-2 Novosibirsk on 19 July 2015 in a game against FC Irtysh Omsk.

References

External links
 Career summary by sportbox.ru
 
 
 Profile at Crimean Football Union

1998 births
Living people
Sportspeople from Irkutsk
Russian footballers
Association football midfielders
Russian expatriate footballers
Expatriate footballers in Belarus
FC Sibir Novosibirsk players
FC Zvezda Irkutsk players
FC Belshina Bobruisk players
FC Nosta Novotroitsk players
FC Okean Kerch players
Crimean Premier League players